Pierre Coustain was a painter and sculptor at the Court of Philip the Good. His name occurs in the records of the brotherhood of St. Luke at Bruges in the year 1450 as Painter Royal.

References
 

Year of birth unknown
Year of death unknown
15th-century painters
Arts in the court of Philip the Good
Painters from Bruges
Court painters
Early Netherlandish painters